Sweet F A may refer to:

A murder victim Fanny Adams
British naval slang, of Sweet Fuck All.
Sweet F.A., an album by the British band, Love and Rockets.
Sweet Female Attitude, an English UK garage/dance/R&B duo.